Dokdonella ginsengisoli is a Gram-negative, aerobic, rod-shaped, non-spore-forming and non-motile bacterium from the genus of Dokdonella which has been isolated from soil from a field with ginseng from Pocheon in Korea.

References

Xanthomonadales
Bacteria described in 2009